The 1984 Individual Speedway World Championship was the 39th edition of the official World Championship to determine the world champion rider.

Without former champions Ivan Mauger, Ole Olsen, Peter Collins, Michael Lee, and Bruce Penhall, the 1984 World Final, held for the eighth time at the Ullevi Stadium in Göteborg, Sweden, was seen by some as the battle of the second tier riders. Though history would ultimately prove the first and second placed riders as among the best Motorcycle speedway has ever seen, winning every World Final between them until the end of the 1980s.

Dane Erik Gundersen won his first Speedway World Championship from countryman Hans Nielsen who defeated American Lance King in a run-off for second and third places. Defending champion Egon Müller of West Germany could not reproduce his 1983 World Final form and finished 14th with just 3 points from his 5 rides. 1983 runner-up Billy Sanders of Australia, the track record holder at Ullevi, fared marginally better, finishing 11th with just 5 points.

British Qualification

British Final
June 20, 1984
 Coventry, Brandon Stadium
First 8 to Overseas final

Swedish Qualification

Intercontinental Round

Australian Final
January 29, 1984
 Mildura
First 2 to Overseas final plus 1 reserve

New Zealand Final

 February 4, 1984
  Christchurch
 First 2 to Overseas final plus 1 reserve

Norwegian Final

 April 25, 1984
  Skien
 First 2 to Nordic final

American Final

 June 9, 1984
 Long Beach, Veterans Memorial Stadium
First 3 to Overseas final plus 1 reserve

Nordic Final

 June 12, 1984
 Norrköping, 
First 7 to Intercontinental final

Overseas Final

 July 15, 1984
  Manchester, Belle Vue Stadium
 First 10 to the Intercontinental Final plus 1 reserve

Intercontinental Final

 July 20, 1984
  Vojens
 First 12 to World Final plus 1 reserve

Continental Round

Continental Final

 July 22, 1984
  Rovno
 First 5 to World Final plus 1 reserve

World Final
1 September 1984
 Göteborg, Ullevi

References

1984
Individual
Individual
Speedway competitions in Sweden